Lazarus Hangula has been the vice-chancellor of the University of Namibia ,from 2004 to 2018. He replaced Peter Katjavivi, who left to become an ambassador for Namibia. Hangula earned his M.A. and Ph.D. (both cum laude) from the Johannes Gutenberg University of Mainz in Germany. Before his appointment as vice-chancellor he served in various other roles at UNAM, among them Pro vice-chancellor for Academic Affairs and Research. Hangula was a member of Namibia's Delimitation Commission, a body advising on the country's administrative division.

Hangula was conferred the Most Distinguished Order of Namibia: Second Class on Heroes' Day 2014.

References

External links
http://www.unam.na/about_unam/vc_message.html

Year of birth missing (living people)
Living people
Academic staff of the University of Namibia
Johannes Gutenberg University Mainz alumni
Namibian expatriates in Germany